The 1999 FIRA Women's European Championship was the fourth edition of the tournament; it saw the same format as 1997, but with Germany and Ireland being replaced by Kazakhstan and Wales.

Bracket

First round

Plate semi-finals

Semi-finals

7th/8th place

Plate final

3rd/4th place

Final

See also
Women's international rugby union

External links
FIRA website

1999
1999 rugby union tournaments for national teams
International women's rugby union competitions hosted by Italy
1998–99 in European women's rugby union
1998–99 in French rugby union
1998–99 in Italian rugby union
1998–99 in English rugby union
1998–99 in Welsh rugby union
1998–99 in Scottish rugby union
1999 in Dutch women's sport
1999 in Kazakhstani sport
rugby union
rugby union
rugby union
rugby union
rugby union